The Serie B 1954–55 was the twenty-third tournament of this competition played in Italy since its creation.

Teams
Parma and Taranto had been promoted from Serie C, while Palermo and Legnano had been relegated from Serie A.

Final classification

Results

References and sources
Almanacco Illustrato del Calcio - La Storia 1898-2004, Panini Edizioni, Modena, September 2005

Serie B seasons
2
Italy